Said-Khasan Abumuslimov (also spelled Sait-Khassan Abumuslimov and Said-Hassan Abumuslimov) is a historian, writer and publicist. In the years 1996–1997 he was acting vice president of the breakaway Chechen Republic of Ichkeria under acting president Zelimkhan Yandarbiyev.

Biography 
He was born on February 1, 1953, in the Kazakh SSR. 

In 1974, Abumuslimov and Khozh-Ahmed Noukhaev co-founded the Chechen separatist group Obshina. 

He studied History and German Language at the Lomonosov University in Moscow, finishing in 1981. In 1990, he received his PhD.

Between 1990 and 1994, Sait-Khassan Abumuslimov lectured history at the State University in Grozny. He also took part in the drafting of the Chechen Constitution.

Later, he served in a number of government positions under Chechen separatist president Dzhokhar Dudayev and under Dudayev's successor Yandarbiyev.

In 1996-97 he was the vice-president to Zelimkhan Yandarbiev.

Since 1999, Abumuslimov has lived outside Chechnya and has been conducting academic research on different topics. He is member of the Academic Forum for International Security and of the German-Caucasian Society.

References 

Vice presidents of Chechnya
1953 births
Chechen historians
Chechen politicians
Chechen writers
Living people
People of the Chechen wars
Politicians of Ichkeria
Chechen people